Costa Rica–Mexico relations are the diplomatic relations between Costa Rica and Mexico. Both nations are members of the Association of Caribbean States, Community of Latin American and Caribbean States, Organization of American States, Organization of Ibero-American States and the United Nations.

History 

Costa Rica and Mexico are two Latin American nations that share a common history in the fact that both nations were colonized by the Spanish empire. During Spanish colonization, Costa Rica was under the administration of the Viceroyalty of New Spain in Mexico City. In 1821, Mexico gained independence from Spain and Costa Rica became a part of the First Mexican Empire. In 1823, the empire dissolved and Costa Rica, along with El Salvador, Guatemala, Honduras and Nicaragua joined the United Provinces of Central America. In 1838, the union dissolved and Costa Rica became an independent nation. That same year, Costa Rica and Mexico established diplomatic relations.

In March 1948, Costa Rica entered into a civil war. During the war, the ambassadors of Chile, Mexico, Panama and the United States met at the premise of the Mexican embassy in San José and agreed to mediate between both belligerents of the war to bring them to a peaceful resolution. This was known as the Pacto de la embajada de México. The war ended in April 1948 and Costa Rica entered into its 'Second Republic.'

During the central-American wars taking place in neighboring El Salvador, Guatemala and Nicaragua; both Costa Rica and Mexico led mediation dialogues between warring factions in each nation in order to bring peace and stability to the region. Mexico (along with Colombia, Panama and Venezuela) created the Contadora Group which helped create the framework for the Esquipulas Peace Agreement, led by Costa Rica's President Oscar Arias.

There have been several high-level visits between leaders of both nations. Both nations work closely together in multilateral organizations and Mexico supports the inclusion of Costa Rica as a member of APEC and the Pacific Alliance.

High-level visits

Presidential visits from Costa Rica to Mexico

 President José Joaquín Trejos Fernández (1967)
 President José Figueres Ferrer (1971)
 President Rodrigo Carazo Odio (1979)
 President Óscar Arias (1987, 2009, 2010)
 President Rafael Ángel Calderón Fournier (January, February, May & July 1991, 1992, 1994)
 President José María Figueres Olsen (1994)
 President Miguel Ángel Rodríguez (January, June & November 2000; 2001, 2002)
 President Abel Pacheco de La Espriella (2004)
 President Laura Chinchilla (2011)
 President Luis Guillermo Solís (2014)
 President Carlos Alvarado Quesada (2021)

Presidential visits from Mexico to Costa Rica

 President Gustavo Díaz Ordaz (1966)
 President Carlos Salinas de Gortari (1992)
 President Ernesto Zedillo (1999)
 President Vicente Fox (2002, 2004, 2005, 2006)
 President Felipe Calderón (2009, 2010)
 President Enrique Peña Nieto (2013)

Bilateral agreements
Both nations have signed several bilateral agreements such as an Agreement on Telegraph Exchanges (1931); Agreement on Touristic Cooperation (1980); Agreement of Cooperation to Combat Drug Trafficking and Drug Dependency (1989); Agreement on Air Transportation (1991); Agreement on Educational and Cultural Cooperation (1995); Treaty on the Execution of Criminal Judgments (1999); Treaty for the Recovery and Return of Stolen Vehicles and Aircraft or Matter of Illicit Disposition (2000); Agreement on Strategic Association (2009); Agreement on the Exchange of Information in Tax Matters (2011); Extradition Treaty (2011); Treaty of International Criminal Law Assistance (2012); Agreement on Development Cooperation (2013) and an Agreement to Avoid Double Taxation and Prevent Tax Evasion in Income Tax (2014).

Transportation
There are direct flights between both nations with Aeroméxico, VivaAerobús and Volaris Costa Rica.

Trade relations 
In 1995, Costa Rica and Mexico signed a free trade agreement. In 2018, two-way trade between both nations amounted to US$1.3 billion. Costa Rica's main exports to Mexico include: software, computer processors and palm oil. Mexico's main exports to Costa Rica include: televisions, vehicles and avocados. In 2013, Mexican investments to Costa Rica amounted to US$1.5 billion. At the same time, Costa Rican investments in Mexico amounted to US$173 million. Mexico is Costa Rica's third largest trading partner globally. Several Mexican multinational companies such as América Móvil, Cemex, Grupo Bimbo and Gruma (among others) operate in Costa Rica.

Resident diplomatic missions 
 Costa Rica has an embassy in Mexico City.
 Mexico has an embassy in San José.

See also 
 Mexican immigration to Costa Rica

References

External links 
 Mexican Ministry of Foreign Affairs on bilateral relations between Mexico and Costa Rica (in Spanish)

 
Mexico
Bilateral relations of Mexico